This list of German flags details flags and standards that have been or are currently used by Germany between 1848 and the present.

National flags

Standards

Presidential standard

Imperial family standards

Other standards

Military

German Navy

Military and state flags

Non-Governmental flags

Civil ensign

German Scouting flags

Other youth organisations

Sport flags

Vexillology Associations flags

Flags of German states

Flags of German districts

Flags of German municipalities

Most municipalities have unique flags. Like state flags, most of them are with either a bicolor or tricolor stipes with or without the emblem ("wappen").

Unofficial regional flags

Political flags

Religious flags

Ethnic groups flags

Historical flags

Francia, Kingdom of Germany, and the Holy Roman Empire (800–1806)

Teutonic Order State and Prussia (1226–1935)

German Confederation (1815–1866)

North German Confederation (1866–1871)

German Empire (1871–1918)

Weimar Republic (1919–1933)

Nazi Germany (1933–1945) 

The flag with the swastika and white disc centered was used throughout (1920–1945) as the NSDAP flag. Between 1933 and 1935, it was used as the national flag and merchant flag – interchangeably with the black-white-red horizontal tricolour last used (up to 1918) by the German Empire. In 1935, the black-white-red horizontal tricolour was scrapped again, and the flag with the off-center swastika and disc was instituted as the only national flag (and was to remain as such until 1945). The flag with the centered disc only continued to be used as the  after 1935.

World War II aftermath in Germany 
Allied Control Council (1945–1949) and Saar Protectorate

East Germany (1949–1990)

Baden-Württemberg

Baden

Hohenzollern-Hechingen and Hohenzollern-Sigmaringen

Leyen

Württemberg

Bavaria

Bavaria

Other countries in today's Bavarian lands

Brandenburg

East Frisia

Hesse

Lower Saxony

Brunswick

Hanover

Oldenburg

Schaumburg-Lippe

Mecklenburg-Vorpommern

North Rhine-Westphalia

Lippe

Other

Rhineland-Palatinate

Palatinate

Mainz

Trier

Saarland

Palatinate

Saxony

Saxony-Anhalt

Anhalt

Anhalt-Bernburg, Anhalt-Dessau and Anhalt-Köthen

Schleswig-Holstein

Heligoland

Holstein

Lübeck

Saxe-Lauenburg

Schleswig

Thuringia

Reuss

Saxe-Altenburg

Saxe-Coburg and Gotha

Saxe-Gotha-Altenburg

Saxe-Meiningen

Saxe-Weimar-Eisenach

Schwarzburg-Sondershausen

Other

Historic flag proposals 
Note: Ottfried Neubecker's proposal of 1919 and those of Josef Wirmer in 1944 and of his brother Ernst in 1948 are clearly modeled on the Nordic Cross flags used in all Nordic countries – the flags of Denmark, Norway, Sweden, Finland and Iceland all having the same horizontal cross, though differing in color.

Nazi Germany occupations (1939–1945)

German colonial empire (1884–1918)

House Flags

German shipping company

German Chartered company

Other companies

German yacht clubs

References

External links